The Oliver D. Filley House is a mansion located on 684 Park Avenue between East 68th and 69th Streets on the Upper East Side of Manhattan, New York City.

History 
It was constructed for Mary Pyne Filley and her husband Oliver D. Filley in 1926, financed by her parents. The architects were McKim, Mead & White, who used the same neo-Federal style that was shown in the firm's adjoining Percy Rivington Pyne House on the corner of 68th Street. The generous action of the Margaret Rockefeller Strong de Larraín, Marquesa de Cuevas in acquiring the property in 1965 and presenting it to the Queen Sofía Spanish Institute, saved the building and assured its architectural integrity.

The Designated Landmark of New York City plaque was provided by the New York Community Trust in 1972.

References

External links 

Houses in Manhattan
New York City Designated Landmarks in Manhattan
Park Avenue
Upper East Side
Houses completed in 1926
1926 establishments in New York City
Historic district contributing properties in Manhattan